Jens Beeck (born 19 September 1969) is a German lawyer and politician of the Free Democratic Party (FDP) who has been serving as a member of the Bundestag from the state of Lower Saxony since 2017.

Early life and career
Beeck completed his school education in 1988 with the Abitur. Afterwards he worked in the catering trade in the Black Forest before he began his studies of law. Beeck passed his first state examination in law in 1996. 

Beeck then worked as an administrative employee at the Nordhorn employment office and completed his basic military service. After his legal clerkship he completed his second state examination in 2000. Since 2001 Beeck has been working as an independent lawyer with his own law firm.

Political career
Beeck joined the FDP in 1987. He became a member of the Bundestag in the 2017 national elections. 

In parliament, Beeck has served on the Committee on Economic Cooperation and Development (2018–2021), the Committee on Labor and Social Affairs (since 2018) and the Committee on Foreign Affairs (since 2021). He is his parliamentary group's spokesperson for the interests of people with disabilities. In addition to his committee assignments, Beeck is part of the German Parliamentary Friendship Group for Relations with the States of Central America.

In the negotiations to form a so-called traffic light coalition of the Social Democratic Party (SPD), the Green Party and the FDP following the 2021 federal elections, Beeck was part of his party's delegation in the working group on children, youth and families, co-chaired by Serpil Midyatli, Katrin Göring-Eckardt and Stephan Thomae.

References

External links 

  

1969 births
Living people
Members of the Bundestag for Lower Saxony
Members of the Bundestag 2021–2025
Members of the Bundestag 2017–2021
Members of the Bundestag for the Free Democratic Party (Germany)